My Checheno-Ingushetia was the regional anthem of the Chechen-Ingush ASSR.

Lyrics

References

Chechen music
National anthems